Pulse is an American house music group.

Releases 
 "The Lover That You Are"
 "Won't Give Up My Music"
 "Yum Yum"
 "Shadows of the Past"
 "Music Takes You"

Of the five tracks they have charted on the Billboard Hot Dance Club Play chart, their best known would also be their only #1: "The Lover That You Are" in 1996 (credited to Pulse featuring Antoinette Roberson). It reached #22 in the UK Singles Chart in May 1996. It was their only UK chart hit. The flip side of the 12" featured an a cappella version of the song, the result of this is that many white label bootleg versions have surfaced, featuring the track being played over the instrumental of another dance track.

See also
 List of number-one dance hits (United States)
 List of artists who reached number one on the US Dance chart

References

External links
 Jellybean recordings artist information

American house music groups
American dance music groups
Electronic music groups from New York (state)
American musical duos